Mansome is a 2012 documentary film directed by Morgan Spurlock, and executive-produced by actors/comedians Will Arnett and Jason Bateman, and Electus founder Ben Silverman.

Themes
Mansome looks at male identity as it is expressed through grooming methods.

Definition of mansome
The term mansome is a neologism in popular culture. The documentary Mansome attempts to clarify exactly what makes a man "mansome".

To groom or not to groom
The film follows three men (in addition to Spurlock), each with completely different opinions on facial hair and the act of grooming.

 Jack Passion is viewed by some as America's greatest beardsman, and is the only American to ever win first place at the German Beard and Moustache Championships. He is also a multiple world champion in the “Natural Full Beard” category. In Mansome, Passion expresses his belief that a man's natural state is to be bearded, and therefore should be embraced. He even goes so far as to say that those who are clean-shaven are stuck in perpetual boyhood. 
 In contrast, Ricky Manchanda is a fashion buyer who believes that proper grooming includes being clean-shaven and perfect. He gets his eyebrows threaded, is a proponent for moisturizing to avoid dry skin and wrinkles, and takes approximately an hour and a half to get ready in the morning. 
 Shawn Daivari, a pro wrestler, portrays the extreme grooming requirements imposed by his profession.

Reception
On review aggregation website Rotten Tomatoes, the film has a rating of 25% based on reviews from 36 critics, with an average rating of 4.7 out of 10. On Metacritic, the film has a score of 35 out of 100, based on reviews from 14 critics indicating "Generally unfavorable reviews".

The Chicago Sun-Times reviewer Richard Roeper gave the film three stars, calling it "a typically whimsical documentary". He noted that "there's a certain late-to-the-party aspect to Mansome, as if Spurlock has just discovered the metrosexual trend of what, 15 years ago?". Owen Gleiberman of Entertainment Weekly gave the film a positive review and a grade of B+. Gleiberman enjoys how the film both celebrates and laughs "all the ways they can be vain and even inane" and calls it a "funny, incisive talking-head commentary".

The staff of The A.V. Club named it one of the worst movies of 2012, criticizing it as "absolutely insufferable, a shabby excuse for a documentary that sadistically stretches to feature length a premise that would barely support a two-minute short".

References

External links
 
 

Films produced by Will Arnett
Films directed by Morgan Spurlock
2010s English-language films